This is a list of all tropical cyclones that have existed between 3°N and 3°S, or within  of the equator. Tropical cyclones are relatively rare in these latitudes, particularly outside of the Northwestern Pacific. Despite this however, out of the seven official tropical cyclone basins, only the North Atlantic and South Pacific basins have never recorded a system in this area. The lack of storm formations in close proximity to the equator is primarily due to a weak Coriolis effect in the region, and only nineteen known storms have formed since records began.

See also

 List of tropical cyclones
 List of tropical cyclone records

References

External links
 

near-Equatorial
Equatorial tropical cyclones